The Martin Bucer Seminary is a European multinational evangelical theological seminary and research institute in the Protestant reformed tradition. The seminary is named after the reformer Martin Bucer.

History and education 
The Martin Bucer Seminary was founded in 1996 in response to the dominance of higher criticism and liberal theology within German universities and seminaries. It offers students theological training in a network of campuses across German-speaking Europe (Germany and Switzerland, in partnership with the German Evangelical Alliance) as well as in the Czech Republic, in Albania, Brazil, Finland, India, and Turkey.

A unique feature of the seminary are the many study centres with up to 20 students, who beside their academic training are interns in local churches. A further unique feature in the world of theological education is a combined curriculum for studies in a number of very different cultural settings of Christianity. The branches in growth oriented Christianity Brazil, minority oriented Christianity Turkey, a secularized Christianity in German speaking Western Europe and Czech Republic are combined into one global curriculum. Students can move around and get their credits at any of the study centers. They are taught by Christian professors and lecturers from other continents and contexts with often different perspectives, which especially challenges Western theology.

With 350 students in 2017 and an additional 450 students attending online courses, it is the largest Evangelical Seminary in Europe outside of the UK. The offered courses enable to receive a Bachelor of Theology and a Master of Theology, that are bestowed by different schools worldwide, most often by South African Theological Seminary (South Africa) and Whitefield Theological Seminary (USA). The seminary is no branch of such schools, but students earn credits there by proving which courses they have taken or papers they have written. President was until 2018 Prof. Dr. Thomas Schirrmacher. His successor is Rev. Dr. Frank Hinkelmann.

Research 

Martin Bucer Seminary also has a research arm that has published a wide range of texts and books focused on ethics, islamic studies, missiology, and religious freedom. These institutes are networks of christian researchers from all over the world.

The seminary is member of the World Reformed Fellowship and connected to the Evangelical Alliance.

Notable faculty 
 Dr Frank Hinkelmann, Lecturer for Church History 
 Professor Dr Clair Davis, Lecturer for Church History
 Professor Dr Thomas K. Johnson, Lecturer for Philosophy of Religion and Ethics
 Professor Dr John Warwick Montgomery, Lecturer for Apologetics
 Professor Dr Christine Schirrmacher, Lecturer for Islamic Studies
 Professor Dr Thomas Schirrmacher, Lecturer for Systematic Theology, Missiology and Religious studies

Publications 
 Bonn Profiles (Press releases)
 MBS-Texte (Texts on Ethics, Philosophy and Theology)
 The WEA-Global-Issues-Series (Resources of the World Evangelical Alliance)
 International Journal for Religious Freedom
 Islam and Christianity

References

External links 
 Official website

1996 establishments in Germany
Evangelical seminaries and theological colleges
Educational institutions established in 1996